Primevil may refer to:

 Primevil (band), a 1970s American rock group
 Primevil, later Mpire of Evil, a UK metal band consisting of Tony Dolan, Jeffrey Dunn, and Anthony Lant
 Primevil (Malibu Comics), an enemy of the superhero Prime

See also 
 Prime Evil (disambiguation)
 Primeval (disambiguation)